Duke's Delight is an album led by pianist Duke Jordan recorded in 1975 and released on the Danish SteepleChase label.

Reception

In his review for AllMusic, Scott Yanow said "The date lives up to its potential".

Track listing
All compositions by Duke Jordan except as indicated
 "Truth" – 7:55
 "(In My) Solitude" (Eddie DeLange, Duke Ellington, Irving Mills) – 5:36
 "Sultry Eve" – 9:46
 "Undecided Lady" – 6:07 		
 "Tall Grass" – 9:13
 "Duke's Delight" – 7:25
 "Undecided Lady" [Alternate Take] – 6:32  Bonus track on CD release
 "Duke's Delight" [Alternate Take] – 7:37  Bonus track on CD release

Personnel
Duke Jordan – piano
Richard Williams – trumpet (tracks 1 & 3–8)
Charlie Rouse – tenor saxophone (tracks 1 & 3–8)
Sam Jones – bass (tracks 1 & 3–8)
Al Foster – drums (tracks 1 & 3–8)

References

1976 albums
Duke Jordan albums
SteepleChase Records albums